Bisel may refer to:

People
 Harry Bisel (1918–1994), American oncologist
 Sara C. Bisel (1932–1996), American anthropologist and archaeologist

Places
 Bisel, Haut-Rhin, Alsace, France